Paula Narváez Ojeda (born 22 May 1972) is a Chilean politician and psychologist who is the Chile ambassador to the United Nations under President Gabriel Boric.

She served as Minister Secretary General of Government during the second administration of Michelle Bachelet. Narváez was the nominee of the Socialist Party in the 2021 Chilean presidential election.

Biography
Paula Narváez was born in Osorno, Los Lagos on 22 May 1972, and spent her childhood and youth in Puerto Montt. Her basic and secondary education took place at the Immaculate Conception school in that city. Later she traveled to Santiago, where she studied psychology at Andrés Bello University, graduating in 1996. She has a master's degree in Economics and Regional Management from Austral University and a master's in Latin American Studies from Georgetown University.

Political career

Narváez entered public administration in Los Lagos Region, where she worked in the National Women's Service (SERNAM) and was regional secretary of labor. In the first government of Michelle Bachelet, she served as regional programming manager. She remained in the position until 5 May 2009.

In October 2009, she became lead spokesperson of Eduardo Frei Ruiz-Tagle, presidential candidate for the Concertación. In 2010 she traveled to India to study English, and upon her return to Chile that September, she worked at the Dialoga Foundation. In 2011 she emigrated to the United States to pursue a master's degree and to do an internship at UN Women – while Michelle Bachelet was executive director – where she was a program advisor for Latin America and the Caribbean.

She returned to Chile in 2014, when she was appointed chief of staff of Bachelet's second government, beginning on 11 March. She remained in office until July 2014, leaving due to her twin pregnancy and being replaced by Ana Lya Uriarte. On 18 November 2016, she was appointed by Bachelet as Minister Secretary General of Government, replacing . She left office on 11 March 2018, at the end of the Bachelet government.

Since 17 September 2018 she has been a specialist advisor on political participation of women in Latin America and the Caribbean for UN Women.

She has fiercely defended Bachelet's management, to the point that it was questioned by it Nueva Mayoría in 2017, when after the defeat of Alejandro Guillier against Sebastián Piñera, Narváez affirmed: "We suffered a huge electoral defeat, but the political defeat remains to be seen", arguing that despite the result "the political project of progressivism is in force in Chile" due to the reforms promoted by Bachelet. She served as a specialist advisor on women's political participation for Latin America and the Caribbean at the UN, from 17 September 2018. He resigned from office prior to announcing his presidential candidacy.

Presidential election of 2021
In December 2020, a group of women and grassroots militants of the Socialist Party wrote a letter entitled Never Again Without Us, proposing Paula Narváez as presidential candidate for the  Chilean elections of 2021 and demanding open and citizen primaries. To date, the letter has received more than a thousand signatures, exceeding the original expectations of its authors, and was signed by the former president Michelle Bachelet. Also in December, a group of citizens created the "CiudadnxsPorPaula" platform, expanding Paula Narváez's support base beyond the Socialist Party of Chile.

On 13 January 2021, Narváez communicated on her Twitter account her decision to run as a presidential candidate for her party, writing: «From my dear Los Lagos Region, I thank all those who with their strength and conviction they have joined the initiative that he assumes a duty with Chile. I have decided to put myself at the service of you and my country. I will run for the presidential candidacy in open and citizen primaries. In April 2021, Narváez received the support of several celebrities from the culture area, among them are; the actor and National Prize winner, Héctor Noguera, the actress Claudia Di Girolamo, the composer Isabel Parra, among many others.

As a presidential candidate of the PS, PPD, PL and NT, presented its government program in June 2021, which has more than 400 measures Of these, the standard-bearer chose 40 measures as the most "urgent and priority" , just as the former President Salvador Allende did during the campaign that led him to La Moneda in 1970. Among those highlighted, the former Minister is committed to the creation of 5 public companies to promote a "new development strategy", which would be the Public Bank for Development, the National Lithium Company, the National Green Hydrogen Company, the National Digital Agency and Codelco-Innova.

Personal life
Paula Narváez is married to Javier Rico, with whom she has twin daughters. She regularly attends the Hindu Temple of Santiago, directed by the Brahmin priest Mahraj Ravi Kewlani.

References

External links
 

1972 births
Andrés Bello National University alumni
Austral University of Chile alumni
Permanent Representatives of Chile to the United Nations
Chilean Ministers Secretary General of Government
Chilean psychologists
Georgetown University alumni
Living people
People from Osorno, Chile
Socialist Party of Chile politicians
Women government ministers of Chile
Chilean women psychologists
Government ministers of Chile